Ace Angler: Nintendo Switch Version (or simply Ace Angler), released in Japan as Fishing Spirits: Nintendo Switch Version, is a 2019 fishing video game published by Bandai Namco Entertainment. The game was released for the Nintendo Switch.

Development and release
Ace Angler is based on Fishing Spirits, a fishing simulator arcade game. In the arcade game, players use their rod controllers to catch the fish swimming on the monitor. A trailer for Ace Angler was released in May 2019.

The arcade game was ported to the Nintendo Switch and released in Japan under the title Fishing Spirits: Nintendo Switch Version on July 25, 2019. It was later released in Southeast Asia on July 21, 2020, as Ace Angler: Nintendo Switch Version. Though release for Western markets never occurred, copyrights for the game's title surfaced in various countries in 2022 (its sequel would be released outside Asia).

Reception
Ace Angler sold over 800,000 copies.

Sequel
Ace Angler: Fishing Spirits, a sequel to the game, was announced in 2022. It was released in Japan on October 27, 2022 and North America on October 28, 2022.

Notes

References

2019 video games
Bandai Namco games
Fishing video games
Multiplayer and single-player video games
Nintendo Switch games
Nintendo Switch-only games
Video games developed in Japan